Rifat Rastoder (born 11 July 1950) is a Montenegrin politician, writer and journalist of Bosniak ethnicity. He was the deputy speaker of the Parliament of Montenegro and the vice-president of the Social Democratic Party of Montenegro.

Biography
In 1969, Rastoder moved to Titograd (today's Podgorica) where he continues to live to this day. He became a professional journalist in 1980. Until 1986, he worked for Radio Crne Gore as a journalist, program editor and the editor of the programming block. In 1990, he was voted Best Journalist. By late 1996, he had become a journalist and editor of the interior-political rubric and commentator for the Pobjeda newspaper. From 1991, he was a journalist and editor in the weekly news magazine Monitor, along with one of the initiators of founding Radio Antena M.

Politically, he was one of the founders and vice-presidents of the Civic Movement since 1990. He is also a member of the board of the Civic Forum and is one of the founders of the Social Democratic Party of Montenegro, of which he was vice-president.

He was chosen as representative in the Parliament four times, and deputy speaker of the Parliament for three mandates of which he served under Svetozar Marović, Filip Vujanović and Ranko Krivokapić. He served as acting President of Montenegro from 19 to 22 May 2003.

Besides speaking his native language, he also speaks Russian and to a lesser degree, English.

Works
Crvena mrlja (1990; co-author)
Usud imena
Pravo na ime

Trivia
His relative, Šerbo Rastoder, is a prominent historian.

References

External links
Biography (in Montenegrin)

1950 births
Living people
Montenegrin Muslims
People from Berane
Bosniaks of Montenegro
Social Democratic Party of Montenegro politicians
Members of the Parliament of Montenegro
Presidents of Montenegro
Montenegrin writers
Montenegrin male writers